Lieutenant General Sir Alexander Maurice Cameron  (30 May 1898 – 25 December 1986) was a senior British Army officer who became General Officer Commanding (GOC) East Africa Command.

Military career
After attending the Royal Military Academy, Woolwich, Cameron was commissioned into the Royal Engineers in February 1916. He served in World War I in France and Belgium taking part in the Battle of Passchendaele for which he received the Military Cross (MC). The citation for his MC reads:

After the War he attended the Staff College, Camberley from 1928 to 1929, alongside fellow students such as John Harding, Gerald Templer, Richard McCreery, Gordon MacMillan, Gerard Bucknall and Alexander Galloway, Cameron was deployed to South Persia and then took part in operations in Kurdistan. He became a brigade major in India in 1934 and then a General Staff Officer in the Anti-Aircraft Corps in 1936.

He served in World War II initially as a General Staff Officer with Anti-Aircraft Command and then as Commander of an anti-aircraft brigade from 1942. He was on the staff of Supreme Headquarters, Allied Expeditionary Force from 1944 to 1945. At this time he started constructing an Allied version of the V-2 rocket.

After the War he became Commander of the Special Project Operations Group which took control of the German guided missile installations. He then became Deputy Quartermaster General for the Royal Engineers in 1945 and Major-General in charge of Administration for Middle East Land Forces in Egypt in 1948.

He was appointed General Officer Commanding East Africa Command in 1951 and, following the Mau Mau Uprising in 1952, was replaced by General Sir George Erskine, becoming Erskine's Second in Command in 1953; he retired in 1954.

He was Director of Civil Defence for South East Region in the UK from 1955 to 1960.

References

Bibliography

External links
Generals of World War II

 

1898 births
1986 deaths
Graduates of the Royal Military Academy, Woolwich
Military personnel from Devon
British military personnel of the Mau Mau Uprising
British Army lieutenant generals
Knights Commander of the Order of the British Empire
Companions of the Order of the Bath
Recipients of the Military Cross
Royal Engineers officers
British Army personnel of World War I
British Army generals of World War II
Graduates of the Staff College, Camberley